Jean-Marc Théolleyre (31 July 1924 – 12 June 2001) was a 20th-century French journalist.

Biography 
1943: Resistant in Lyon and then in Toulouse, he was arrested and deported to Buchenwald for nearly two years and was released in 1945.
November 1945: joined Le Monde as reporter. Professional card #6312. 
1950-1957: Judicial Chronicler in Le Monde. During this period he followed some of the great post-war trials like that of Amélie Rabilloud, Marie Besnard, Oradour-sur-Glane, the Dominici affair, and Jacques Fesch. 
April 1957 – November 1957: Senior reporter for Le Figaro littéraire. 
November 1957: Senior reporter for Paris-Journal. 
1959: Retuened to Le Monde, a chief reporter and a judicial columnist.
1970-75: Permanent envoy for the Rhône-Alpes region.
From 1975: Literary critic and senior reporter in charge of the judicial chronicle.
1967: Vice-President of the Association of the Judicial Press.
In 1987, he covered for Le Monde the trial in Lyon of  Klaus Barbie.

Distinctions 
Prix Albert Londres (1959)
Prix Louis Hachette for the print media (1988) for his paper "Klaus Barbie: nothing to say".

Judicial conviction for defamation 
Jean-Marc Théolleyre was convicted in 1983 by the Paris Court of Appeal for defamation, having suggested in his book  (ed. Messidor, 1982) that "Jean-Marie Le Pen professed neo-Nazi opinions". The Court's judgment, inter alia, stated that "he did not exercise the caution, reserve and objectivity required by amalgamating or insinuating" (Paris Court of Appeal, 15 June 1983).

Bibliography 
 1956: 
 1966: 
 1977: 
 1982: 
 1991: 
 1998:  (with )

External links 
 Hommage sur le blog "Chroniques judiciaires" de P. Robert-Diard
 Jean-Marc Théolleyre, mort d'un Juste on Libération (15 June 2001)
 Jean-Marc Théolleyre incarnait une haute idée du journalisme on La Croix
 Jean-Marc Théolleyre, l’observateur engagé (1945-1965) on CAIRN
 Jean-Marc Théolleyre on Babelio

20th-century French journalists
Albert Londres Prize recipients
Buchenwald concentration camp survivors
Writers from Lyon
1924 births
2001 deaths